Pavol Kopp is a Slovak sport shooter who competes in the men's 10 metre air pistol. At the 2008 Summer Olympics, he finished in 27th place in the men's 10 m air pistol, failing to make the final.  In the 50 metre pistol, he reached the final, finishing 5th.  At the 2012 Summer Olympics, he finished 21st in the qualifying round in the men's 10 m air pistol, failing to make the cut for the final.  He also failed to make the final round in the 50 metre pistol, where he finished 20th.

References

Slovak male sport shooters
Year of birth missing (living people)
Living people
Slovak people of German descent
Olympic shooters of Slovakia
Shooters at the 2008 Summer Olympics
Shooters at the 2012 Summer Olympics
Shooters at the 2016 Summer Olympics
Shooters at the 2015 European Games
European Games silver medalists for Slovakia
European Games medalists in shooting